Aleksei Nikolayevich Kostylev (1914 in Moscow – 1989 in Moscow) was a Soviet Russian football player and coach.

Career
During World War II Kostylev played for the Soviet FC Spartak Kishenev at the newly Soviet occupied territories of Bessarabia (Moldavian SSR). After the Nazi invasion of the Soviet Union he became a POW at Mauthausen-Gusen concentration camp.

After the war, he continued to coach at Southern Russia and Ukraine.

External links
 

1914 births
1989 deaths
Footballers from Moscow
People from Moskovsky Uyezd
Soviet footballers
Russian footballers
Soviet football managers
Russian football managers
FC Rotor Volgograd managers
FC Hoverla Uzhhorod managers
FC Chornomorets Odesa managers
FC Metalurh Zaporizhzhia managers
FC Fakel Voronezh managers
FC Lokomotiv Moscow managers
FC Kuban Krasnodar managers
Association football midfielders
FC Dynamo Kazan players
Soviet military personnel of World War II
Mauthausen concentration camp survivors